Marc Cocozza (born 8 January 1981) is a Scottish former footballer. After beginning his career as a youth player at Celtic, he briefly played for both Dundee United and Forfar Athletic.

Career
Cocozza began his career with Celtic but failed to make a senior appearance for the club, leaving in November 2001 to sign for Dundee United. Cocozza made his debut in a televised match against Celtic but made only one further substitute appearance and failed to earn an extension to his short-term deal. After being released in April 2002, Cocozza moved to Forfar Athletic at the start of the 2002–03 season, although had to wait until February 2003 to make his debut. After playing in three matches, Cocozza was released by the end of the season and he left senior football, signing for junior club Johnstone Burgh. The following year, Cocozza joined Maryhill, where he stayed until 2005.

In 2014, Cocozza was appointed manager of the Ayrshire Amateur Football Association's select team, having previously been assistant manager.

International career
Cocozza represent his country at several age levels, playing for Scotland at under-16, under-17 and under-19 level.

References

External links
 

1981 births
Living people
Footballers from Glasgow
Scottish footballers
Celtic F.C. players
Dundee United F.C. players
Forfar Athletic F.C. players
Scottish Premier League players
Scottish Football League players
Johnstone Burgh F.C. players
Maryhill F.C. players
Scotland youth international footballers
Association football defenders
Scottish Junior Football Association players